2M is a Moroccan free-to-air television network. It was established by the royal-owned conglomerate, ONA, before being partly sold to the Moroccan state. Of 2M, 45.3% is owned by Atlas Benjelloun's holding company SNI, while approximately 32.5% is controlled by the Moroccan state. It is based in Casablanca.

The channel is available free-to-air locally on digital signal with national coverage, and on satellite television via Globecast, Nilesat and Arabsat.

2M offers services in Arabic, French, and Berber.

Background
2M was set up as a second national television channel with the aim of promoting competition and diversity in Moroccan audio-visual broadcasting.

2M started its programmes officially on 4 March 1989. It used to be a cable channel broadcasting unscrambled twice a day. After 7 years of activity, SOREAD (ONA group), the major shareholder, withdrew from the management of this TV channel due to financial reasons. The Moroccan state took over the control of 2M with a participation of 68% in its capital. This takeover was supported by a major effort to develop the audio-visual sector.

Radio 2M is the companion radio channel to 2M, presenting music, news, and information directly from Morocco in Arabic and French.

Content
2M challenged taboos by debating controversial issues and established a reputation for itself as a symbol of freedom of speech in Morocco. The channel regularly broadcasts news, films, sports and music. It is a government-controlled public TV station and it has been alleged that the government also controls editorial choices.

2M has two separate feeds: one available nationwide via terrestrial television, and a satellite feed under the branding 2M Monde (French for lit. 2M World). Both feeds have the same local shows but are aired at different times. 2M Monde does not broadcast Hollywood movies and American TV shows because the network only buys their broadcasting rights for within Morocco.

The channel gained controversy when on 23 November 2016, it aired a segment on its morning show Sabahiyat 2M, on how to cover beaten bruises with makeup on the International Day to Eliminate Violence Against Women. 2M apologized on 28 November for airing the segment, calling it an "error in judgment."

2M in figures
Personnel: 500 people, including 30% executives;
Coverage: 80% of the population;
Capital: 302,371,500 Moroccan dirham (€27,008,467 / £18,228,395 / US$36,750,427), including 68% owned by the state and 20.7% owned by Mohammed VI's holding SNI.

Programming

Foreign shows
List of American and European TV shows broadcast by the local version of 2M (which may change time by time):

 24
 Alias
 Bones
 Buffy (Buffy contre les vampires)
 CSI (Les Experts)
 CSI: NY (Les Experts : Manhattan)
 CSI: Miami (Les Experts : Miami)
 Cuenta Atràs (Moroccan dubbing)
 Damages
 Dark Angel
 Desperate Housewives
 Dexter
 Friends
 Gossip Girl
 Instant Star (Ma vie de star)
 Jericho
 Just Cause (En quête de justice)
 Law & Order (New York District)
 Law & Order: Special Victims Unit (New York unité spéciale)
 Los hombres de Paco (Moroccan dubbing)
 Mad Men
 Medium
 Maid in Manhattan (Amour à Manhattan)
 Más sabe el diablo (L'Ange du diable, El Diablo)
 NCIS (NCIS : Enquêtes spéciales)
 Un paso adelante (Un, dos, tres) (Arabic dubbing)
 Prison Break
 Rubí (Arabic dubbing)
 Stargate Atlantis
 The 4400 (Les 4400)
 The Invisible Man (Invisible Man)
 The O.C. (Newport beach)
 The Shield
 The Simpsons
 Ugly Betty
 Vermist (Moroccan dubbing)

American TV shows and Hollywood movies are imported from France with French dubbing. Some Mexican and Turkish TV shows are dubbed locally in Moroccan Arabic.

All of the aforementioned shows are broadcast on both the local and satellite versions of the channel.

Locally-produced

 Arabic afternoon news bulletin (الظهيرة)
 Berber news bulletin (ⵉⵏⵖⵎⵉⵙⵏ)
 French evening news bulletin (Info Soir)
 Arabic evening news bulletin (المسائية)
 EcoNews
 Sabahiyat 2M

 Rachid Show
 Shahiwat maa Shoumisha
 L'Couple
 Maa Lnass (lit. "With the People")
 Moubacharatan Maakoum
 Obesity Challenge (تحدي السمنة)

See also
Samira Sitail
Leila Ghandi

References

External links

1989 establishments in Morocco
Arabic-language television stations
Berber-language mass media
French-language television stations
Television stations in Morocco
Mass media in Casablanca
Television channels and stations established in 1989
Société Nationale d'Investissement
Mass media companies of Morocco
ONA Group